Earl Carroll Vanities is a 1945 American musical film directed by Joseph Santley and written by Frank Gill Jr. The film stars Dennis O'Keefe, Constance Moore, Eve Arden, Otto Kruger, Alan Mowbray and Stephanie Bachelor. It was released on April 5, 1945 by Republic Pictures.

The film's title refers to the real-life revue The Earl Carroll Vanities, but the film is not related to Earl Carroll Sketchbook, a film that would be released the following year.

Plot

Princess Drina returns to America where she was educated. She is traveling with her betrothed, the usually inebriated Grand Duke Paul, and with Queen Mother Elena, who wants Drina to secure a bank loan that will sustain their small republic economically.

Drina encounters Tex Donnelly, an American woman who runs a nightclub, and confides that her secret wish is to sing and dance. Tex's business partner and songwriter Danny Baldwin needs a replacement when the club's star entertainer, his girlfriend Claire Elliott, sprains an ankle. Tex offers Drina a chance to perform, and she is an instant success. Meanwhile, impresario Earl Carroll is seeking talent for his new revue, The Earl Carroll Vanities.

Danny and Claire resent the attention that Drina receives over the next two weeks, and Claire exposes the secret that Drina is actually royalty. Queen Elena insists that Drina give up showbusiness and return to her duties, but when Tex's master of ceremonies tricks her into one last appearance on stage, Drina is loved by everyone, including Danny.

Cast

References

External links 
 

1945 films
1940s English-language films
American musical films
1945 musical films
Republic Pictures films
Films directed by Joseph Santley
American black-and-white films
1940s American films